Play TV is a former music entertainment channel of Pakistan owned by Business Recorder Group. Play TV was 24-hour music, entertainment  and lifestyle channel. It played videos of Pakistani as well as Indian & International Artists. The channel changed its format to complete entertainment channel by the name of Play Max but soon revamped to Play Entertainment and now airs local and foreign entertainment content.

Programming

Aale O
Dastan e Ishq
Game On Hai
Play Your Request
Girl Power
Gossip Town
Gamerrang
Play Station
Play Cocktail
Filmroll
Fit Hai
F For FriehaLive with AnisaIndepthItem NumberStudent BoardI Know I Can DanceDNNDial 9Desi TakraDesi TouchFreewayJump OffNews PlayClub PlayCurrent HitsCNG MushairaMusic HQMC ClashPlay It For MePMC Pakistan Music ChartsJutt Butt & YoKaun Teri DulhaniyaPlay On DemandPlaying It LiveReady Steady GoRPL Ramzan Premier LeagueSuper GreatsSunday Concert SpecialThe Most Respectable ShowThe TenThe Real NewsTwilightUncutWild ChildWhats Your ProblemMindsetOn The RoadOm Shanti OmStar StruckPress PlayPlay Top TenPlay Djuice Top TenBollywood BingoBollywood Top TenUK Desi ChartYo YashmaZindagi Chalti RahayForeign Programming7 Days
Angel
Angels in America
Dark Angel
Monk
My Wife and Kids
Roswell
The West Wing

Children series
 Power Rangers Lightspeed Rescue

See also
 List of music channels in Pakistan
Play Entertainment
Aaj Entertainment
Aaj News
Business Recorder Group
List of Pakistani television stations

References

External links
 Official Site
 The Business Recorder Group

 

Television stations in Pakistan
Television channels and stations established in 2005
Television stations in Karachi